Master of the Furies is the provisional name of an ivory sculptor working in the early 17th century. The name is derived from their characteristic work, showing shouting furies, in the Kunsthistorisches Museum Vienna. All their works are without any signature. The earliest record of their works are found in an inventory of Maria Magdalena of Austria.

External links 

The Master of the Furies - Press release of the Liebighaus Frankfurt am Main (in German)

Furies, Master of the